In Greek mythology, Cragaleus (Ancient Greek: Κραγαλεύς) was a son of Dryops who dwelt in the land Dryopis next to a spring which was believed to have appeared at a place where Heracles hit the earth with his club.

Mythology 
Cragaleus was renowned as just and wise, and was one day visited by Apollo, Artemis, and Heracles who asked him to act as an arbiter in their argument as to which of the three should become patron of Ambracia, Epirus. Apollo argued that the city should belong to him on account of the fact that Epirus was once conquered by his son Melaneus, and that he assisted the Ambraciotes in the war against the natives of Epirus, and brought law and order to Ambracia. Artemis reminded that it was she who saved the Ambraciotes from the tyrant Phalecus, having sent a lioness to kill him. Finally, Heracles brought up the fact that it was he who destroyed the many non-Greek peoples of Epirus for trying to steal the kine of Geryon from him, and that the Corinthians, who later came to Epirus and founded Ambracia, were his descendants. Cragaleus considered Heracles' argument the most convincing and declared him the winner. Apollo was enraged and turned Cragaleus into stone. Since then, the Ambraciotes sacrificed to Apollo the Saviour, but believed their city to belong to Heracles and the Heracleidae, and honored Cragaleus with sacrifices as well.

See also
List of Greek mythological figures

Notes

References 
 Antoninus Liberalis, The Metamorphoses of Antoninus Liberalis translated by Francis Celoria (Routledge 1992). Online version at the Topos Text Project.
 Realencyclopädie der Classischen Altertumswissenschaft, Band XI, Halbband 22, Komogrammateus-Kynegoi (1922), s. 1566.
 Wilhelm Heinrich Roscher (ed.): Ausführliches Lexikon der griechischen und römischen Mythologie. Band 2, Leipzig 1890 - 1894, s. 1403

Epirotic mythology
Deeds of Apollo
Metamorphoses into inanimate objects in Greek mythology